Bodil Jørri Jensen Steen (14 January 1923 – 10 January 1979) was a Danish stage and film actress.

Filmography

I dag begynder livet - 1939
Tror du jeg er født i går? - 1941
Når katten er ude - 1947
Det hændte i København - 1949
Op og ned langs kysten - 1950
Vores lille by - 1954
Hendes store aften - 1954
I kongens klær - 1954
Min datter Nelly - 1955
Det var på Rundetårn - 1955
Taxa K-1640 Efterlyses - 1956
Hvad vil De ha'? - 1956
Lån mig din kone - 1957
Pigen og vandpytten - 1958
Det lille hotel - 1958
Rikki og mændene - 1962
Det tossede paradis - 1962
Han, hun, Dirch og Dario - 1962
Pigen og pressefotografen - 1963
Slottet - 1964
Pigen og millionæren - 1965
Sytten - 1965
Mor bag rattet - 1965
Soyas tagsten - 1965
Dyden går amok - 1966
Min kones ferie - 1967
Lille spejl - 1978

External links

 Bodil Steen at Danskefilm.dk

Danish stage actresses
Danish film actresses
1923 births
1979 deaths
Actresses from Copenhagen
20th-century Danish actresses